Homoneura is a genus of small flies of the family Lauxaniidae.

Species
H. abnormis Gao & Yang, 2004
H. aequalis (Malloch, 1914)
H. aldrichi Miller, 1977
H. americana (Wiedemann, 1830)
H. apicomata Shi & Yang, 2009
H. arizonensis Miller, 1977
H. bakeri Miller, 1977
H. bergenstammi Czerny, 1932
H. biconcava Shi, Wang & Yang, 2011
H. birdi Miller, 1977
H. bispina (Loew, 1861)
H. bistriata (Kertész, 1915)
H. biumbrata (Loew, 1873)
H. brevis Gao & Yang, 2004
H. californica Miller, 1977
H. canariensis (Becker, 1908)
H. chelis Carles-Tolra, 1996
H. christophi (Becker, 1895)
H. cilifera (Malloch, 1914)
H. clavata Miller, 1977
H. columnaria Shi & Yang, 2009
H. conjuncta (Johnson, 1914)
H. consobrina (Zetterstedt, 1847)
H. convergens Shi & Yang, 2009
H. cornuta Sasakawa, 2001
H. crickettae Miller, 1977
H. curva Miller, 1977
H. denticuligera Shi, Wang & Yang, 2011
H. dilecta (Rondani, 1868)
H. disciformis Shi, Wang & Yang, 2011
H. disjuncta (Johnson, 1914)
H. elliptica Shi, Wang & Yang, 2011
H. ericpoli Carles-Tolra, 1993
H. flabella Miller, 1977
H. flavida Shi & Yang, 2009
H. fratercula (Malloch, 1920)
H. fraterna Loew, 1861)
H. fuscibasis (Malloch, 1920)
H. guangdongica Shi, Wang & Yang, 2011
H. harti (Malloch, 1914)
H. hospes Allen, 1989
H. houghii (Coquillett, 1898)
H. imitatrix (Malloch, 1920)
H. immaculata (de Meijere, 1910)
H. inaequalis (Malloch, 1914)
H. incerta (Malloch, 1914)
H. interstincta (Fallén, 1820)
H. jiangi Gao & Yang, 2004
H. johnsoni Miller, 1977
H. knowltoni Miller, 1977
H. kortzasi Tsacas, 1959
H. lamellata (Becker, 1895)
H. lamellata Becker, 1895)
H. latissima Shi & Yang, 2009
H. licina Séguy, 1941
H. limnea (Becker, 1895)
H. littoralis (Malloch, 1915)
H. longicomata Shi, Wang & Yang, 2011
H. longispina Gao & Yang, 2004
H. mallochi Miller, 1977

H. media Miller, 1977
H. mediospinosa Merz, 2003
H. melanderi (Johnson, 1914)
H. minor (Becker, 1895)
H. modesta (Loew, 1857)
H. nebulosa Sasakawa, 2011
H. nigrimarginata Shi, Wang & Yang, 2011
H. nigritarsis Shi & Yang, 2009
H. notata (Fallén, 1820)
H. nubila (Melander, 1913)
H. nubilifera (Malloch, 1920)
H. occidentalis (Malloch, 1920)
H. octostriata Czerny, 1932
H. ocula Miller, 1977
H. ornatipes (Johnson, 1914)
H. patelliformis (Becker, 1895)
H. pernotata (Malloch, 1920)
H. philadelphica (Macquart, 1843)
H. picea Wulp, 1891
H. picta (de Meijere, 1904)
H. psammophila Miller, 1977
H. pufujii Shi, Wang & Yang, 2011
H. quadrifera Shi, Wang & Yang, 2011
H. remmi Papp, 1978
H. semicircularis Shi & Yang, 2009
H. serrata Gao & Yang, 2002,
H. setitibia Shewell, 1940
H. setula Miller, 1977
H. severini Shewell, 1939
H. sheldoni (Coquillett, 1898)
H. shewelli Miller, 1977
H. singularis Yang, Hu & Zhu, 2002
H. tenera (Loew, 1846)
H. tenuispina Loew, 1861)
H. tesquae (Becker, 1895)
H. thalhammeri Papp, 1978
H. tianeensis Gao & Yang, 2004
H. tianlinensis Gao & Yang, 2004
H. tortifurcata Shi & Yang, 2009
H. transversa (Wiedemann, 1830)
H. trochantera Miller, 1977
H. truncata Miller, 1977
H. unguiculata (Kertész, 1913)
H. utahensis Miller, 1977
H. wheeleri Miller, 1977
H. yinggelingica Shi & Yang, 2009
H. zhangae Shi & Yang, 2009

References

Lauxaniidae
Schizophora genera
Taxa named by Frederik Maurits van der Wulp